Yang Likai (born 29 March 2001), formerly known as Yang Jiatao, is a Chinese footballer who plays as a midfielder.

Career statistics

Club
.

References

2001 births
Living people
Chinese footballers
Association football midfielders
Chinese Super League players
Qingdao F.C. players